Tlaxco Municipality may refer to:
 Tlaxco Municipality, Puebla
 Tlaxco Municipality, Tlaxcala

See also
 Tlaxco (disambiguation)

Municipality name disambiguation pages